Slobodan Ćuk is a Serbian author, inventor, business owner, electrical engineer, and professor of electrical engineering at the California Institute of Technology (Caltech).  The Ćuk switched-mode DC-to-DC voltage converter is named after him.

Biography
For over 20 years, he was a full-time Professor of Electrical Engineering at the California Institute of Technology until January 1, 2000.

In 1979, Slobodan founded TESLAco, located in Laguna Niguel, California.  It had a charter to apply basic research results developed at Caltech for practical commercial and military designs.

Over 30 patents have Ćuk's name on them.

Personal life

Slobodan's parents are Milojko and Julijana Ćuk.  He speaks American English and Serbian. On February 29, 1972, Slobodan immigrated from Belgrade, Yugoslavia to the United States and was sponsored by NASA.

Slobodan received a Dipl.Ing. from University of Belgrade in 1970, a M.S. in Electrical Engineering from Santa Clara University in 1974, and a Ph.D. in Power Electronics from the California Institute of Technology (Caltech) in 1977.

Bibliography

Books
 Power Electronics, Vol. 5: Power Electronics: A New Beginning; Ćuk Slobodan; announced but not released yet
 Power Electronics, Vol. 4: State-Space Averaging and Ćuk Converters; Ćuk Slobodan; 2016; 
 Power Electronics, Vol. 3: Advanced Topics and Designs; Ćuk Slobodan; 2015; 
 Power Electronics, Vol. 2: Modeling, Analysis, and Measurements; Ćuk Slobodan; 2015; 
 Power Electronics, Vol. 1: Topologies, Magnetics, and Control; Ćuk Slobodan; 2015;

Books (Coauthor)
 Advances in Switched-Mode Power Conversion, Vol. 3:; Ćuk Slobodan and R.D. Middlebrook; 1983; ASIN B000H4NQLY
 Advances in Switched-Mode Power Conversion, Vol. 2: Switched-mode Topologies; Ćuk Slobodan and R.D. Middlebrook; 1981; ASIN B00125WN16
 Advances in Switched-Mode Power Conversion, Vol. 1: Modeling, Analysis, and Measurement; Ćuk Slobodan and R.D. Middlebrook; 1981; ASIN B003XX2EB4

Patents
 US Patent 7915874, filed in 2010, "Step-down converter having a resonant inductor, a resonant capacitor and a hybrid transformer" (Ćuk-Buck2 converter)
 US Patent 4257087, filed in 1979, "DC-to-DC switching converter with zero input and output current ripple and integrated magnetics circuits" (Ćuk converter)

Patents (Coauthor)
 US Patent 7778046, filed in 2008, "Voltage step-up switching DC-to-DC converter"
 US Patent 5442539, filed in 1992, "Ćuk DC-to-DC switching converter with input current shaping for unity power factor operation"
 US Patent 4274133, filed in 1979, "DC-to-DC Converter having reduced ripple without need for adjustments" (Ćuk converter)
 US Patent 4184197, filed in 1977, "DC-to-DC switching converter" (Ćuk converter)

Papers
 Modeling, Analysis, and Design of Switching Converters; PhD thesis at California Institute of Technology; November 1976

Papers (Coauthor)
 A General Unified Approach to Modelling Switching-Converter Power Stages; IEEE Power Electronics Specialists Conference; June 8, 1976

Magazine articles
 "Hybrid-Switching Step-down Converter with Hybrid Transformer"; Power Electronics; May 2011 (Ćuk-Buck2 converter)
 "Single-Stage Isolated Bridgeless PFC Converter Achieves 98% Efficiency"; Power Electronics; November 2010

See also
 Ćuk converter
 DC-to-DC converter
 Switched-mode power supply

References

External links
  - official website
 Slobodan Ćuk videos on YouTube - official channel
 PCIM 2011 Presentation Slides

Living people
Year of birth missing (living people)
American inventors
American electrical engineers
American writers
Yugoslav emigrants to the United States
California Institute of Technology faculty
California Institute of Technology alumni
University of Belgrade alumni
Santa Clara University alumni
Serbian inventors
Serbian engineers